Mág (Magician) is a 1988 Czech film directed by František Vláčil. The film is about Czech poet Karel Hynek Mácha. It is Vláčil's last film. The film received mixed reviews and critics called it a reflection of Vláčil's previous work.

Plot
Mácha goes to Litoměřice where he accepted position as a Notary. He plans to marry Lori who is getting prepared for the wedding. Mácha's brother Michal comes instead of him and announces that Mácha is dead. The film then switches to when Mácha and Lori met. Maácha and Lori met in Kajetán's theatre. The film shows Mácha's and Lori's relationship. It also shows Mácha's meeting with ill girl Márinka who is a fan of his poems. Mácha also hears that someone called Hynek killed his father in jealousy. It inspires Mácha to make his most famous poem, Máj. When Máj is released it is received negatively and Mácha needs to provide Lori who is pregnant and accepts position as a Notary in Litoměřice. He spends his free time at Rádobyce. One day there is a fire and Mácha helps but his organism succumbs illness and he dies.

Cast
 Jiří Schwarz as Karel Hynek Mácha
 Veronika Žilková as Lori Šomková
 Věra Tichánková as Lori's mother
 Blažena Holišová as Mácha's mother
 Jan Hrušínský as Mácha's brother Michal
 Marta Vančurová as Márinka
 Zdeněk Řehoř as Márinka's father
 Václav Knop as Josef Kajetán Tyl
 Jana Švandová as Leni Forchheimová
 Tomáš Juřička as Jan Kaška
 Alexej Okuněv as Karel Sabina
 Jan Kraus as Trojan

References

External links
 

1988 drama films
1980s historical films
1988 films
Czech historical drama films
1980s Czech-language films
Czechoslovak drama films
Films directed by František Vláčil
Karel Hynek Mácha
1980s Czech films